Tetz is the second-largest district in the city of Linnich, Düren district, North Rhine-Westphalia, Germany.

History 
Originally, Tetz was a Romano - Celtic settlement. The name is attributed to a "Deciacum", a "Good Roman." Through different linguistic transformations, that name became Titzich, then Titze, and finally Tetz.

Between the villages of Boslar and Tetz, remains of a former Roman manor were found. In the Middle Ages, Tetz first belonged to the Counts of Jülich. After several ownership changes, Tetz finally came into the possession of the Lords of Brachel. The last owner of the castle, Baron Maximilian Freiherr von Brachel, died in 1964.

Tetz once had a church, the holy Consecrated Lambertus, that dated to 1291. It was destroyed by German soldiers in WW2 before their withdrawal and the occupation by American troops. The reconstruction of the church continued into the 1950s.

Clubs 
Because of the municipal reorganization in 1969, the former municipality of Tetz is now part of the town of Linnich. The town has grown steadily in recent decades by the construction of numerous new business and residential areas. Many clubs have become established. There are modern sports facilities and a multipurpose hall, the Rurauenhalle, which hosts comedy acts and important meetings. Some of the other clubs include:

 FC turf sports Tetz
 Carnival society "Fidele Brothers" Tetz
 Church choir of St. Joseph Tetz
 Schutterij St. Lambertus Tetz
 Tennis club green and white Tetz
 TTC Tetz
 Gymnastic club Tetz 1975 e. V.

References and Links 
Tetz - City of Linnich

Düren (district)